Leningrad Communist University or LKU was a Soviet teaching establishment designed to create cadres for Party and government work.

Created in 1918 as the Zinoviev Worker-Peasant University, it was renamed in 1921 the Zinoviev Communist University and in 1929 the All-Union Stalin Communist University. It was the first educational establishment in Russia to teach criminal investigation. In 1932 it became the Stalin National High Communist Agricultural University, "the Party smithy of cadres for the socialist village." During the 1933-34 academic year, about 1,200 students were being trained to serve as kolkhoz chairmen and MTS directors.

In 1944 it was reorganized as part of the Leningrad Higher Party School.

References

Bibliography 
Igal Halfin, Stalinist Confessions: Messianism and Terror at the Leningrad Communist University, University of Pittsburgh Press, 2009: 
I.V. Znamenskaya and M.A. Rumyantsev, "Kommunisticheskii universitet imeni Zinov'eva (Leningrad)," Istoki 1 (1989): 335-338.

See also 
 List of modern universities in Europe (1801–1945)

Higher education in the Soviet Union
Universities in the Soviet Union
Educational institutions established in 1944